Iridomyrmex atypicus is a species of ant of the genus Iridomyrmex. It was recently described by Heterick and Shattuck in 2011. Specimens recorded were only found in Lake Mere in New South Wales. They were only found in paddocks.

Etymology
The ant has its name due to its distinctive nature of its appearance.

References

Iridomyrmex
Hymenoptera of Australia
Insects described in 2011